Clava can refer to:
 Mu Boötis, a triple star system in the constellation Boötes
 Clava cairn, a type of Bronze Age circular chamber tomb cairn
 Gracile nucleus, an area of the brain that participate in the sensation of fine touch and proprioception of the lower body
 The club-like segments at the end of some insect antennae
 Clava (cnidarian), a genus of marine hydroid